Stefan Legein (born November 24, 1988) is a Canadian former professional ice hockey right winger. He was drafted by the Columbus Blue Jackets in the 2nd round, 37th overall of the 2007 NHL Entry Draft.

Playing career
Legein spent most of his junior career in the OHL, playing only one year in another league, the Ontario Provincial Junior A Hockey League (OPJHL) before being drafted by the Columbus Blue Jackets. Legein participated in the 2007 CHL Top Prospects Game and the OHL Eastern Conference All-Star Team in 2007, where he won the fastest skater competition, completing a single lap in 14.109 seconds. He also recorded 3 points in the game (2 goals, 1 assist). Prior to the 2008-09 season, Legein made headlines following his announcement to retire from the game though no official reason was announced, later that season, he announced that he would like to return to the game and joined the Syracuse Crunch of the AHL for the remainder of the season.

On October 20, 2009, Legein was traded by the Blue Jackets to the Philadelphia Flyers for fellow minor leaguer, Mike Ratchuk. Legein was later traded on October 12, 2011, along with a 2012 sixth-round draft pick, to the Los Angeles Kings for future considerations.

On October 5, 2013, the Toronto Marlies of the American Hockey League signed Legein to a professional tryout contract. In the 2013–14 season, Legein appeared in 7 games with the Marlies before opting to sign for the remainder of the season in Sweden with VIK Västerås HK of the second division, HockeyAllsvenskan. In the following season, Legein belatedly signed in Germany with DEL2 club, Heilbronner Falken.

On September 2, 2015, Legein returned to the United States and signed a one-year contract with Los Angeles Kings now ECHL affiliate, the Manchester Monarchs. He ended his career playing semi-professionally for the Stoney Creek Generals who compete for the Allan Cup in the 2016–17 season.

International play

In 2007, Legein was a member of Team Canada in the 2007 Super Series against Russia. Legein was later selected to be a member of Team Canada in the 2008 World Junior Ice Hockey Championships in Pardubice, Czech Republic.

Career statistics

Regular season and playoffs

International

Awards and honours

References

External links

1988 births
Living people
Adirondack Phantoms players
Canadian ice hockey right wingers
Columbus Blue Jackets draft picks
Greenville Road Warriors players
Heilbronner Falken players
Ice hockey people from Ontario
Manchester Monarchs (AHL) players
Manchester Monarchs (ECHL) players
Mississauga IceDogs players
Niagara IceDogs players
Syracuse Crunch players
Toronto Marlies players
Tulsa Oilers (1992–present) players
VIK Västerås HK players
Canadian expatriate ice hockey players in Sweden
Canadian expatriate ice hockey players in the United States